Maibritt Kviesgaard (born 15 May 1986) is a former Danish handball player. She has also played on the Danish national team.

She competed at the 2010 European Women's Handball Championship, where the Danish team placed fourth, and Kviesgaard was voted into the All-Star Team as Best Right Wing.

References

1986 births
Living people
Sportspeople from Aarhus
Danish female handball players
KIF Kolding players